Grassy Nook is a mountain in Barnstable County, Massachusetts. It is located on west of South Orleans in the Town of Brewster. Mill Hill is located northeast of Grassy Nook

References

Mountains of Massachusetts
Mountains of Barnstable County, Massachusetts